A by-election was held for the New South Wales Legislative Assembly electorate of Newcastle on 14 April 1891 because of the death of James Fletcher.

The East Sydney by-election was held on the same day.

Dates

Results
				
				

				

				
James Fletcher died.

See also
Electoral results for the district of Newcastle
List of New South Wales state by-elections

References

New South Wales state by-elections
1891 elections in Australia
1890s in New South Wales